Optica (formerly known as The Optical Society (OSA) and before that as the Optical Society of America) is a professional society of individuals and companies with an interest in optics and photonics. It publishes journals and organizes conferences and exhibitions. It currently has about 488,000 customers in 183 countries, including nearly 300 companies.

History 
Optica was founded in 1916 as the "Optical Society of America", under the leadership of Perley G. Nutting, with 30 optical scientists and instrument makers based in Rochester, New York. It soon published its first journal of research results and established an annual meeting. The first local section was established in Rochester, New York, in 1916 and the Journal of the Optical Society of America was created in 1918. The first series of joint meetings with the American Physical Society was in 1918. In 2008 it changed its name to The Optical Society (OSA). In September 2021, the organization's name changed to Optica, which references the organization's journal and is geographically neutral in order to reflect the global membership of the society.

Scientific publishing 

The society publishes a number of journals and a magazine.

Primary journals
 Advances in Optics and Photonics, ;  2009–present - Publishing long review articles and tutorials.
 Applied Optics,  (print);  (online);  1962–present - Covering optical applications-centered research.
 Biomedical Optics Express, ; 2010–present - An open access journal covering optics, photonics and imaging in the life sciences.
 Journal of the Optical Society of America, 1917–1983, which was split into two journals in 1984:
 Journal of the Optical Society of America A,  (print);  (online); 1984–present - Covering research on optics, image science, and vision.
 Journal of the Optical Society of America B,  (print);  (online); 1984–present - Covering research on optical physics
 Optica, ;  2014–present - Rapid dissemination of high-impact results in all areas of optics and photonics.
 Optical Materials Express, ;  2011–present - An open access journal covering advances in novel optical materials, their properties, modeling, synthesis and fabrication techniques.
 Optics Express, ; 1997–present - An open access journal covering all areas of optics.
 Optics Letters,  (print);  (online); 1977–present - Providing rapid publication of short papers in all fields of optical science and technology.
 OSA Continuum, ; 2018–present – An open access journal providing rapid publication of papers in optics and photonics

Partnered journals
 Applied Spectroscopy, 1951–present. Published by the Society for Applied Spectroscopy.
 Chinese Optics Letters, 2003–present. Published by Chinese Laser Press.
 Journal of Optical Communications and Networking, 2009–present. Jointly published by OSA and IEEE. Published from 2002 to 2009 as Journal of Optical Networking.
 Journal of Display Technology, 2005–2016. Jointly published by OSA and IEEE.
 Journal of Lightwave Technology, 1998–present. Jointly published by OSA and IEEE.
 Journal of Near Infrared Spectroscopy, 1993–present. Published by SAGE Publishing.
 Journal of Optical Technology, 1999–present. English translation of Opticheskii Zhurnal published by the S. I. Vavilov State Optical Institute.
 Journal of Optical Society of Korea, 2007–present.  Published by the Optical Society of Korea.
 Photonics Research, 2013–present. Jointly published by OSA and Chinese Laser Press.

Magazine
Optics and Photonics News, 1975–present. Distributed to all members.

Recognitions
Optica presents awards and honors, including Optica Fellow, Honorary Membership, and Awards/Medals. Optica's awards and medals program is endowed through the Optica Foundation, and includes more than 20 named awards; among them are the following:

 Adolph Lomb Medal
 C.E.K. Mees Medal
 Charles Hard Townes Award
 David Richardson Medal
 Edgar D. Tillyer Award
 Edwin H. Land Medal
 Ellis R. Lippincott Award
 Emmett N. Leith Medal
 Esther Hoffman Beller Medal
 Frederic Ives Medal/Jarus W. Quinn Prize
 Herbert Walther Award
 John Tyndall Award
 Joseph Fraunhofer Award/Robert M. Burley Prize
 Max Born Award
 Michael Stephen Feld Biophotonics Award
 Nick Holonyak Jr. Award
 Paul F. Forman Team Engineering Excellence Award
 R. W. Wood Prize
 Robert E. Hopkins Leadership Award
 Sang Soo Lee Award
 Stephen D. Fantone Distinguished Service Award
 The Joseph W. Goodman Book Writing Award
 William F. Meggers Award in Spectroscopy

Presidents
The following persons are or have been presidents of the society:

See also
American Institute of Physics
American Physical Society
European Optical Society
European Photonics Industry Consortium
International Commission for Optics
Optical Society of London
Optics Classification and Indexing Scheme
Society for Imaging Science and Technology
SPIE

References

External links
 
 The Inter-Society Color Council records at Hagley Museum and Library (contain materials from the Optical Society of America including annual meeting programs, reports issued by the Committee on Colorimetry, and issues of the Society's official publication, the Journal of the Optical Society of America.)

 
Physics societies
Scientific organizations established in 1916
Organizations based in Washington, D.C.
Optics institutions
1916 establishments in New York (state)